A penumbral lunar eclipse took place on Tuesday, January 20, 1981, the first of two lunar eclipses in 1981. In a rare total penumbral eclipse, the entire Moon was partially shaded by the Earth (though none of it was in complete shadow), and the shading across the Moon should have been quite visible at maximum eclipse. The penumbral phase lasted for 4 hours and 24 minutes in all, though for most of it, the eclipse was extremely difficult or impossible to see. The moon's apparent diameter was larger because the eclipse occurred 5.2 days after perigee (Perigee on approximately 1981 Jan 15 at 03:01:56.7 UTC).

This was a relatively rare total penumbral lunar eclipse with the moon passing entirely within the penumbral shadow without entering the darker umbral shadow.

More details about the Penumbral Lunar Eclipse of 1981 Jan 20. 

Penumbral Magnitude = 1.01360

Umbral Magnitude = -0.01916

Gamma = -1.01421

Sun Right Ascension = 20.16

Sun Declination = -20.1

Sun Diameter: 1950.4 arc-seconds (32'30.4")

Moon Right Ascension = 8.15

Moon Declination = 19.1

Moon Diameter = 1888.6 arc-seconds (31'28.6")

Earth's Shadow Right Ascension: 8.16

Earth's Shadow Declination: 20.1

Earth's Shadow Diameter: 8,968.32 arc-seconds (2.4912 degrees)

Greatest Eclipse: Tuesday, 20 January 1981 at 07:49:56.7 UTC

Saros Series = 114th (57 of 71)

Visibility

Related lunar eclipses

Eclipses in 1981 
 A penumbral lunar eclipse on Tuesday, 20 January 1981.
 An annular solar eclipse on Wednesday, 4 February 1981.
 A partial lunar eclipse on Friday, 17 July 1981.
 A total solar eclipse on Friday, 31 July 1981.

Lunar year series

Saros series
Lunar Saros series 114, repeating every 18 years and 11 days, has a total of 71 lunar eclipse events including 13 total lunar eclipses.

First Penumbral Lunar Eclipse: 0971 May 13

First Partial Lunar Eclipse: 1115 Aug 07

First Total Lunar Eclipse: 1458 Feb 28

First Central Lunar Eclipse: 1530 Apr 12

Greatest Eclipse of Lunar Saros 114: 1584 May 24

Last Central Lunar Eclipse: 1638 Jun 26

Last Total Lunar Eclipse: 1674 Jul 17

Last Partial Lunar Eclipse: 1890 Nov 26

Last Penumbral Lunar Eclipse: 2233 Jun 22

Half-Saros cycle
A lunar eclipse will be preceded and followed by solar eclipses by 9 years and 5.5 days (a half saros). This lunar eclipse is related to two annular solar eclipses of Solar Saros 121.

See also 
List of lunar eclipses
List of 20th-century lunar eclipses

Notes

External links 
 

1981-01
1981-01
1981 in science
January 1981 events